Personal Secretary is a 1938 American comedy film directed by Otis Garrett and written by Betty Laidlaw, Robert Lively and Charles Grayson. The film stars William Gargan, Joy Hodges, Andy Devine, Ruth Donnelly, Samuel S. Hinds and Frances Robinson. The film was released on September 9, 1938, by Universal Pictures.

Plot
Columnists from two rival newspapers go back and forth over whether or not a woman murdered her playboy husband.

Cast        
William Gargan as Marcus 'Mark' Farrell
Joy Hodges as Gale Rodgers
Andy Devine as 'Snoop' Lewis
Ruth Donnelly as Grumpy
Samuel S. Hinds as Alan Lemke
Frances Robinson as June Reese 
Florence Roberts as Mrs. J. J. Farrell
Kay Linaker as Flo Sampson
Matty Fain as 'Slim' Logan
Selmer Jackson as Blackmere

References

External links
 

1938 films
American comedy films
1938 comedy films
Films directed by Otis Garrett
Universal Pictures films
American black-and-white films
1930s English-language films
1930s American films